Xylopia discreta is a species of plant in the Annonaceae family. It is native to Brazil, Colombia, French Guiana, Guyana, Suriname, and Venezuela. Carl Linnaeus the Younger, the botanist who first formally described the species using the basionym Unona discreta, named it after its purple, aromatic fruit which set it apart ( in Latin) from other members of the family.

Description
It is a tree reaching 22 meters in height. Its young branches are silky, narrow, and pliable. The lance-shaped, hairless, papery leaves are in two rows, alternate. Its petioles very short. The flower pedicels are clustered in umbels. The fruit are purple and aromatic.

Reproductive biology
The pollen of Xylopia discreta is shed as permanent tetrads.

Distribution and habitat
It has been observed growing in forests.

Uses
Bioactive compounds extracted from its leaves and seeds have been reported to have antileishmanial activity in laboratory tests.

References

Plants described in 1782
Flora of Brazil
Flora of Colombia
Flora of French Guiana
Flora of Guyana
Flora of Suriname
Flora of Venezuela
Taxa named by Carl Linnaeus the Younger
discreta